F.D. Rose Building, also known as Rose Court, is a historic commercial building located at Muncie, Delaware County, Indiana. It was built in 1926, and is a two-story, rectangular, Rural Medieval style brick building.  The building features a steep slate gable roof concealing a flat roof, an arcade / atrium plan, and a stucco and half-timber exterior.

It was added to the National Register of Historic Places in 1984.

References

Commercial buildings on the National Register of Historic Places in Indiana
Tudor Revival architecture in Indiana
Commercial buildings completed in 1926
Buildings and structures in Muncie, Indiana
National Register of Historic Places in Muncie, Indiana